And then it rained for seven days is the debut album by Irish group Music for Dead Birds, released by Rusted Rail in April 2009.

Release 
Released on the Mini CD single format, The album was self produced by the band and was mainly recorded using a 4-track tape deck. General reception of the album from critics was good; however, it was criticized for its lo-fi quality. The album currently has a 1.84 rating on Rate Your Music.

Track listing 
 17
 What Did You Expect?
 The Sex
 To Grow Up Wet
 Pill, Oh
 Four Years From Now
 Houses On Hilltops
 Dead To Me

References

External links 
 "And then it rained for seven days" on Rusted Rail.

2009 debut albums
Music for Dead Birds albums
Rusted Rail albums